Paul Wormley (born 16 September 1961) is a former English professional footballer.

Career
Born in Leeds, Yorkshire, Wormley was a regular player with the Leeds United youth team, and played for Leeds City Boys from under 11 through to under 15. He also represented Yorkshire School Boys and was an England Schoolboy international.

After playing as a young teenager in open age non-league football for Yorkshire Amateur, he signed professionally for Barnsley, where he made his English league debut. He made his league debut against Bury in 1979 at the age of 17. He then signed for Huddersfield Town, but due to a serious knee injury he never made a first team appearance for the club in the league, though did play regularly for the reserve team.

In 1981 Wormley was contracted to play out in Australia on a sporting visa, joining Launceston Juventus in Tasmania, before moving with Ken Worden to Townsville Kern United in 1982. Townsville won both the league championship and Ampol cup that year, the first Queensland club to do so. In 1983 he was signed by West Adelaide SC and played under Alan Vest. When Vest moved to Floreat Athena in 1984, he convinced Wormley to join him. He went on to finish as the club's leading scorer in five of the next seven seasons, winning many trophies including the State league and domestic cup three years in a row.

Wormley represented the Western Australian State team for 7 seasons from 1984 through to 1990. Thus being one of the longest serving & leading representatives of the WA State team. He represented WA in overseas tours of Asia and against visiting teams such as Nottingham Forest, Millwall and FC Torpedo Moscow.

In 1990 Wormley played for Eastern Sports Club in Hong Kong and also represented Hong Kong against Aston Villa. Wormley later returned to Australia and played for Perth SC, Fremantle City and Inglewood United, becoming player/coach for the latter. Wormley as player coach, led Inglewood United to the Western Australia State League Championship in 1996, thus becoming the first debutant state league coach to do so. In 1997 Wormley was awarded the WA State Soccer Coach of the year award. 
Wormley was appointed the Western Australian State Coach in 1999, during a period in which they played against the former European Cup Winners Red Star Belgrade and the Malaysian U23 National side. 
Wormley retired from football in 2002 to start his own Company.

References

1961 births
Living people
Footballers from Leeds
English footballers
English football managers
Association football forwards
Yorkshire Amateur A.F.C. players
Barnsley F.C. players
Huddersfield Town A.F.C. players
Launceston City FC players
Townsville Kern United players
West Adelaide SC players
Floreat Athena FC players
Eastern Sports Club footballers
Perth SC players
Inglewood United FC players
English Football League players